Grewia  is a large flowering plant genus in the mallow family Malvaceae, in the expanded sense as proposed by the Angiosperm Phylogeny Group. Formerly, Grewia was placed in either the family Tiliaceae or the Sparrmanniaceae. However, these were both not monophyletic with respect to other Malvales - as already indicated by the uncertainties surrounding placement of Grewia and similar genera - and have thus been merged into the Malvaceae. Together with the bulk of the former Sparrmanniaceae, Grewia is in the subfamily Grewioideae and therein the tribe Grewieae, of which it is the type genus.

The genus was named by Carl Linnaeus, in honor of the botanist Nehemiah Grew (1641-1712) from England. Grew was one of the leading plant anatomists and microscope researchers of his time, and his study of pollen laid the groundwork for modern-day palynology.

Ecology and uses
Several Lepidoptera caterpillars are found to feed on Grewia species. These include the common nawab (Polyura athamas) and the swift moth Endoclita malabaricus. The Bucculatricidae leaf miner Bucculatrix epibathra is apparently only found on G. tiliaefolia.

The parasitic wasp Aprostocetus psyllidis of the Eulophidae occurs on and around phalsa (G. asiatica). Its larvae are parasitoids of other insects - possibly pests of the plant, but this is not known for sure.

Several species, namely phalsa, are known for their edible fruit, which are of local commercial importance. The astringent and refreshing Grewia drupes are particularly popular in summertime. Folk medicine makes use of some species, which are reputed to cure upset stomachs and some skin and intestinal infections, and seem to have mild antibiotic properties. G. mollis is reputed to contain β-carboline alkaloids, though whether such compounds occur in other species too and whether they are produced in quantities to render the plants psychoactive has not been thoroughly studied.

In Myanmar, the bark of the Grewia tree is mixed with the soapy kinpun (Senegalia rugata) fruit and sometimes lime to make the traditional shampoo tayaw kinpun, which remains widely used by the Burmese people and commonly sold in the country's open-air markets, typically in plastic bags.

Explorer Ludwig Leichhardt described preparing a refreshing drink from the seeds of native Australian species G. polygama.

Selected species

 Grewia abutifolia (= G. sclerophylla Roxb. ex G. Don, Sterculia tiliacea Leveille)
 Grewia asiatica – phalsa, falsa
 Grewia avellana Hiern. (= G. calycina N.E.Br., G. hydrophila K.Schum., G. perennans K.Schum.)
 Grewia bicolor Juss. (= G. disticha Dinter & Burret, G. grisea, G. kwebensis N.E.Br., G. miniata Mast. ex Hiern., G. mossambicensis)
 Grewia biloba G.Don – Bilobed Grewia (= G. biloba var. glabrescens (Benth.) Rehder, G. glabrescens Benth., G. parviflora var. glabrescens (Benth.) Rehder & E.H.Wilson)
 Grewia biloba var. microphylla (Maxim) Hand.-Mazz. (= G. parviflora var. microphylla Maxim.)
 Grewia biloba var. parviflora (Bunge) Hand.-Mazz. (= G. chanetii H.Lév., G. parviflora Bunge, G. parviflora var. velutina Pampanini)
 Grewia bilocularis Balf.f.
 Grewia caffra Meisn. (= G. fruticetorum J.R.Drummond ex Baker f.)
 Grewia calymmatosepala K.Schum.
 Grewia celtidifolia Juss. (= G. asiatica var. celtidifolia (Jussieu) L.F.Gagnepain, G. simaoensis Y.Y.Qian, G. yunnanensis H.T.Chang)
 Grewia ciclea andilambarika (Malagasy)
 Grewia crenata (J.R.Forst.) Schinz & Guillaumin (= G. malococca, G. persicaefolia, G. prunifolia, Mallococca crenata) – au‘ere (Cook Islands), fau ui (Samoa), fo ui (Tonga)
 Grewia damine Gaertn. (= G. tiliifolia Vahl)
 Grewia eriocarpa Juss. (= G. boehmeriifolia Kanehira & Sasaki, G. elastica Royle, G. lantsangensis Hu)
 Grewia falcistipula K.Schum. 
 Grewia flava DC. (= G. cana Sond., G. hermannioides Harv.)
 Grewia flavescens Juss. (= G. flavescens var. longipedunculata Burret)
 Grewia glabra Blume – sometimes included in G. multiflora
 Grewia glandulosa Vahl (= G. salicifolia Schinz)
 Grewia goetzeana K.Schum.
 Grewia hexamita Burret (= G. messinica Burtt Davy & Greenway, G. schweickerdtii Burret)
 Grewia hirsuta Vahl.
 Grewia hornbyi Wild
 Grewia inaequilatera Garcke
 Grewia insularis Ridl. (Christmas Island)
 Grewia lasiocarpa E.Mey. ex Harv.
 Grewia latifolia F.Muell. ex Benth.
 Grewia limae Wild 
 Grewia microthyrsa K.Schum. ex Burret
 Grewia mollis Juss.
 Grewia monticola Sond. (= G. cordata N.E.Br., G. discolor, N.E.Br.)
 Grewia multiflora Juss. (= G. didyma Roxb. ex G.Don, G. disperma Rottler, G. guazumifolia Juss., G. jinghongensis Y.Y.Qian, G. oblongifolia Blume, G. serrulata DC.)
 Grewia occidentalis L. – Crossberry
 Grewia olukondae Schinz. (= G. flavescens var. olukondae (Schinz) Wild)
 Grewia optiva J.R.Drumm. ex Burret (= G. oppositifolia Buch.-Ham. ex D.Don)
 Grewia orientalis Carl Linnaeus
 Grewia oxyphylla Burret 
 Grewia pachycalyx K.Schum.
 Grewia picta (= G. aldabrensis Baker 
 Grewia retinervis Burret (= G. deserticola Ulbr.)
 Grewia retusifolia Kurz
 Grewia robusta Burch
 Grewia rothii DC 
 Grewia savannicola ("Dogs balls")R.L.Barrett
 Grewia schinzii K.Schum. (= G. velutinissima Dunkley)
 Grewia similis K.Schum.
 Grewia stolzii Ulbr.
 Grewia sulcata Mast.
 Grewis tembensis Fresen.
 Grewia tenax (Forssk.) (= Chadara tenax Forssk., G. populifolia Vahl)
 Grewia tiliifolia Vahl (= G. rotunda C.Y.Wu, G. tiliaefolia (lapsus), Tilia rotunda C.Y.Wu & H.T.Chang)
 Grewia transzambesica  Wild 
 Grewia turbinata Balf.f. 
 Grewia villosa Willd.

Formerly placed here
Some species once placed in Grewia (or genera synonymous with it) have since been moved elsewhere, particularly to Microcos:

 Alangium salviifolium (as G. salviifolia L.f.)
 Dombeya boehmiana (as Vincentia boehmiana (F.Hoffm.) Burret)
 Kleinhovia hospita (as G. meyeniana)
 Microcos chungii (as G. chungii Merr.
 Microcos nervosa – possibly belongs in M. paniculata (as G. nervosa (Lour.) Panigrahi)
 Microcos paniculata (as G. microcos L. and possibly G. nervosa (Lour.) Panigrahi)
 Microcos triflora (as G. stylocarpa Warb. and G. stylocarpa var. longipetiolata Merr.)
 Trichospermum mexicanum (as G. mexicana DC.)

Footnotes

References

  (2001): Angiosperm Families Containing Beta-Carbolines. Version of 2001-OCT-04. Retrieved 2008-JUN-25.
  (2007): Flowering Plant Families of the World. Firefly Books, Richmond Hill, Ontario, Canada. 
  (2008a): Partial Synonymy of Grewia. Retrieved 2008-JUN-25.
  (2008b): Partial Synonymy of Dombeya. Retrieved 2008-JUN-25.
  (2007a): Germplasm Resources Information Network - Grewia. Retrieved 2008-JUN-25.
  (2007b): USDA Plants Profile: Grewia. Retrieved 2008-JUN-25.

 
Malvaceae genera
Taxa named by Carl Linnaeus